Eudist is a member of the Congregation of Jesus and Mary, a Society of Apostolic Life in the Roman Catholic Church.

Eudist may also refer to:

 Eudist Servants of the 11th Hour, a religious community in Tijuana, Mexico, founded by Antonia Brenner
 Eudist Lake, a lake in the Côte-Nord region, in Quebec, Canada

See also
 Eudes (disambiguation)